Pornpawee Chochuwong (born 22 January 1998) is a Thai badminton player. She was the girls' singles silver medalist at the 2015 Asian and 2016 World Junior Championships. She was also part of the Thai winning teams at the 2017 and 2019 Southeast Asian Games. Chochuwong won her first World Tour title at the 2020 Spain Masters by beating the reigning Olympic champion Carolina Marín in the final.

Career

2021 
Chochuwong reached the finals of the All England Open, but lost to second seeded Nozomi Okuhara of Japan in straight games. She then made her Top 10 debut in the BWF World Rankings on 23 March 2021.

Achievements

Southeast Asian Games 
Women's singles

BWF World Junior Championships 
Girls' singles

Asian Junior Championships 
Girls' singles

BWF World Tour (1 title, 3 runners-up) 
The BWF World Tour, which was announced on 19 March 2017 and implemented in 2018, is a series of elite badminton tournaments sanctioned by the Badminton World Federation (BWF). The BWF World Tours are divided into levels of World Tour Finals, Super 1000, Super 750, Super 500, Super 300 (part of the HSBC World Tour), and the BWF Tour Super 100.

Women's singles

BWF Grand Prix (1 runner-up) 
The BWF Grand Prix had two levels, the BWF Grand Prix and Grand Prix Gold. It was a series of badminton tournaments sanctioned by the Badminton World Federation (BWF) which was held from 2007 to 2017.

Women's singles

  BWF Grand Prix Gold tournament
  BWF Grand Prix tournament

BWF International Challenge/Series (3 titles, 3 runners-up) 
Women's singles

  BWF International Challenge tournament
  BWF International Series tournament

Record against selected opponents 
Record against Year-end Finals finalists, World Championships semi-finalists, and Olympic quarter-finalists. Accurate as of 21 November 2022.

References

External links 
 

1998 births
Living people
Pornpawee Chochuwong
Pornpawee Chochuwong
Badminton players at the 2018 Asian Games
Pornpawee Chochuwong
Asian Games medalists in badminton
Medalists at the 2018 Asian Games
Competitors at the 2017 Southeast Asian Games
Competitors at the 2019 Southeast Asian Games
Competitors at the 2021 Southeast Asian Games
Pornpawee Chochuwong
Pornpawee Chochuwong
Southeast Asian Games medalists in badminton
Pornpawee Chochuwong